Nathalie Badate (born 28 August 1991) is a Togolese footballer who plays as a midfielder for French club FC Tarascon and captains the Togo women's national team.

References

External links 

1991 births
Living people
Sportspeople from Lomé
Togolese women's footballers
Women's association football midfielders
Togo women's international footballers
Togolese expatriate footballers
Togolese expatriate sportspeople in France
Expatriate women's footballers in France